This is a list of films which placed number-one at the weekend box office in Australia during 1999. Amounts are in Australian dollars.

(N.B.: Seemingly improper dates are due to holiday weekends or other occasions. N/A denotes information that is not available from Urban Cinefile nor Movie Marshal.)

See also
List of Australian films — Australian films by year

1999
Australia
1999 in Australian cinema